Kallithea is a former municipality on the island of Rhodes, in the Dodecanese, Greece. Since the 2011 local government reform it is part of the municipality Rhodes, of which it is a municipal unit. It lies on the northeastern portion of the island, just south of the City of Rhodes. The population is 9,364 (2011 census) and the land area is 109.75 km². The seat of the municipality was in Kalythies. The beach resort Faliraki is also situated in the municipal unit.

References

External links

Populated places in Rhodes